This is a list of notable pork dishes. Pork is the culinary name for meat from the domestic pig (Sus domesticus). It is one of the most commonly consumed meats worldwide, with evidence of pig husbandry dating back to 5000 BC. Pork is eaten both freshly cooked and preserved.

The consumption of pork is prohibited in Judaism, Islam, and some Christian denominations such as Seventh-day Adventism.

Fresh pork may contain trichinosis, a parasitic disease caused by eating raw or undercooked pork or wild game infected with the larvae of a species of roundworm Trichinella spiralis, commonly called the trichina worm. In the United States, the U.S. Department of Agriculture recommends cooking ground pork, that is obtained from pig carcasses, to an internal temperature of 160 °F, followed by a 3-minute rest, and cooking whole cuts to a minimum internal temperature of 145 °F, also followed by a 3-minute rest.

Pork dishes

A

B
 Babi guling (Indonesian pig roast)
 
  (can also be made with beef or lamb)

C

D

E
 
 
 
 
 Entremeada

F

G

 
 Gammon

H

I

J

K

 
 
 
 
 
 Khao Kha Mu (Braised pork leg on rice)
 Khao Mu Krob (Crispy pork on rice)
 
 
 Kaeng Kra Dang
 Kho mu yang

L

 
 
 
 
 
 
 
 
 
 
 
 Lombo recheado

M

 
 
 
 
 
  (Lo bah png, Taiwanese cuisine)
 
 
 Mu daet diao (Thai Style Pork Jerky)
 
 Moo Manao (Spicy Garlic Lime Pork)
 
 Mu thot krathiam (Fried pork with garlic)

N

O

P

 
 
 
 
 
 
 
 
 
 
 
 
 
 
 
 
 
 
 , sometimes served with applesauce
 
 
 
 
 
 
 Pork roast

R

 , or Mao's pork belly
 , pork version
 
 Roast pork:
  in Cuban cuisine
 , or Italian roast pork, in Italian cuisine
  in Cantonese cuisine
  in Japanese cuisine
  in Danish cuisine

S

T

V

W

Y

See also

 Bacon
 List of bacon substitutes
 List of sausage dishes
 List of sausages
 List of beef dishes
 List of chicken dishes
 List of fish dishes
 List of hams
 List of ham dishes
 List of lamb dishes
 List of meatball dishes
 List of seafood dishes
 Religious restrictions on the consumption of pork

References

External links
 
 

Pork dishes